Piero Golia (born 1974) is a conceptual artist based in Los Angeles.

Background
As a young man in Naples, Golia studied chemical engineering, learning about the transformation of raw materials into powerful energy sources.

He arrived in Los Angeles in 2002.

Work 
In 2008, Golia was invited to take over a booth at the Art LA fair; his contribution was to completely fill the space with a full-sized passenger bus that had been dramatically crushed by bulldozers to fit the dimensions of the exhibition space.

Retaining ties to his Italian roots, Golia was selected to represent Italy at the Biennale di Venezia in 2013. Golia installed Untitled (My Gold Is Yours) (2013), a gray cube 2.5 meters tall, composed of thirty-six tons of concrete mixed with two kilograms of gold sand and set directly on a grassy outdoor plaza. He then invited visitors to “mine” the sculpture for gold, a social proposition that would transform the physical form and monetary value of the work independent of the artist's own direct actions.

In 2013 he opened Chalet, an underground Hollywood speakeasy (later restaged as Chalet Dallas at the Nasher Sculpture Center in 2015) that was conceived as a space combining architecture, entertainment, and art. Working with architect Edwin Chan, Golia created his Chalets to encourage social interactions and generate a convivial art community that was visited by movie stars, art world luminaries, a local marching band, acrobats, and even a pair of alpacas. During the closing celebration of the four-month-long Dallas installation, Golia hired a mariachi band, arranged a fireworks display, and commissioned a large stage curtain printed with the iconic closing sequence from Looney Tunes cartoons, with the words “That’s All Folks!” His immediately recognizable Mariachi Painting series (2016), made from cut and stretched swatches of the Chalet Dallas curtain, serve as relics of this spectacular event.

At Art Basel in 2017, he realized the kinetic sculpture The Painter, which featured a robot programmed to paint abstract geometric forms onto eight large canvases whenever movement in the exhibition space was detected. The resulting Basel Paintings (2017) retain visual evidence of the process of their own making.

The Mountain School
In 2005, Golia and the artists Eric Wesley and Richard Jackson developed a free, bare-bones, yet ambitious graduate school—no tuition, no degree, but a vigorous curriculum—centered on talks and seminars led by visiting artists and curators. The Mountain School of Arts was born. Over the past fourteen years, the program has evolved into a forum where hundreds of students have received instruction from guest faculty including the artists Tacita Dean, Thomas Demand, Simone Forti, Dan Graham, Mark Grotjahn, Pierre Huyghe, Catherine Opie, Jeff Wall, and many others"

Exhibition history

Solo exhibitions
 2020: Still Life. Gagosian, Britannia Street, London, England. 
 2020: The End. La Fondazione Roma, Rome, Italy. 
 2018: Suddenly, in the middle of the summer. Gagosian Beverly Hills, Los Angeles, CA.
 2018: Solutions to Mortality. Ulrich Museum of Art, Wichita, KS. 
 2017: The painter. Kunsthaus Baselland, Muttenz, Switzerland. 
 2015: Chalet Dallas. Nasher Sculpture Center, Dallas, TX. 
 2015: Intermission Paintings. Gagosian Gallery, Rome, Italy.
 2014: The Comedy of Craft (Intermission). Almine Rech Gallery, Brussels, Belgium. 
 2014: Models, Monuments, and Sculptures on Pedestals. Gagosian Gallery, Paris Project Space, Paris, France.
 2013: finalmente venezia. Galleria Fonti, Naples, Italy. 
 2011: Concrete Cakes and Constellation Paintings. Gagosian Gallery, Los Angeles, CA.
 2011: Double Tumble or the Awesome Twins. Stedeljik Museum, Amsterdam, Netherlands. 
 2009: Oh my God that's so awesome! Bortolami Gallery, New York, NY. 
 2008: Knives. Galleria Fonti, Naples, Italy. 
 2007: Time Machine. Bortolami-Dayan Gallery, New York, NY. 
 2007: Postcards from the edge. Cosmic Galerie, Paris, France. 
 2005: Let the devils do their job. Perry Rubenstein Gallery, New York, NY. 
 2005: February 2005. Galleri Christina Wilson, Copenhagen, Denmark. 
 2005: Piero Golia Piero Golia. Galleria Fonti, Napoli, Italy. 
 2004: The King is Dead. Cosmic Galerie, Paris, France. 
 2003: Maybe not even a nation of millions. Cosmic Galerie, Paris, France. 
 2002: Faccio sul serio! Studio Massimo De Carlo, Milan, Italy. Again. Galleria Maze, Turin, Italy. 
 2002: To whom it may concern. Ecart, Basel, Switzerland. 
 2001: Voi non sapete chi mi credo di essere. Viafarini, Milan, Italy. 
 2000: ...Forever... Galleria Maze, Turin, Italy. 
 2000: Le mucche per Morra. Studio Morra, Naples, FL.

Group exhibitions (selected)
 2020: Broadcast: Alternate Meanings in Film and Video. Gagosian, Park + 75, New York, NY. 
 2019: In Production: Art and the Studio System. Yuz Museum, Shanghai, China. 
 2018: About Photography. Gagosian, San Francisco, CA. 
 2017: The Electric Comma. V-A-C Foundation, Palazzo delle Zattere, Venice, Italy. L.A. Invitational. Gagosian, West 24th St., New York, NY. 
 2016: Conversation Piece | Part 3. Fondazione Memmo Arte Contemporanea, Rome, Italy. 
2016: LEXICON. Gagosian Gallery, Paris, France.  
2016: Par tibi, Roma, nihil. Nomas Foundation, Roman Forum and Palatine Hill, Rome, Italy. 
 2015: Theories on Forgetting. Gagosian Gallery, Beverly Hills, CA. Chromophobia. Gagosian Gallery, Geneva, Switzerland. 
 2014: Prospect.3: Notes for Now. New Orleans, LA. Made in L.A. Hammer Museum, Los Angeles, CA. CLEAR. Gagosian Gallery, Beverly Hills, CA. 
 2013: 55th Biennale di Venezia. Italian Pavilion, Venice, Italy. Mixed Media Messages. Gladstone Gallery, New York, NY. 
 2012: The Mystery Spot. Fondation d'Entreprise Ricard, Paris, France. Micro Mania. Gagosian Gallery, Paris, France. 
 2011: Home Show Revisited. Contemporary Arts Forum, Santa Barbara, CA.

Recognition
2000 Winner IV Ed. Premio “Torino Incontra... l'Arte.” Selected Premio Furla.

1999 Malka Lubelski Foundation Studio Program.

Public collections (selection)
Golia's work is represented in public collections internationally, including:

Los Angeles County Museum of Art, Los Angeles, CA; Marciano Art Foundation, Los Angeles, CA; Museo Jumex, Mexico City, Mexico; Fondazione Morra Greco, Naples, Italy; Nomas Foundation, Rome, Italy; Museo de Arte Contemporáneo de Castilla y León, León, Spain; Stedelijk Museum Amsterdam, Amsterdam, the Netherlands.

Publications

 15 Years of The Mountain School of Arts. Commentaries by: Andrew Berardini, Nana Bahlmann, Edited by: Ieva Raudsepa, John Pike, Tristan Rogers, Scientific editor: Piero Golia. Pages: 293. Format:8.5 x 11 in / 216 x 279 mm. Year: 2021. 
 Piero Golia: The Painter. Edited by Ines Goldbach, Piero Golia, and Lorenzo Micheli Gigotti. With texts by Ines Goldbach, Piero Golia, Jonathan Monk.. Format: 24×34 cm. Pages: 96. Language: EN/DE. Year: 2017. 
 Piero Golia: Desert Interviews or How to Jump Off the Roof and Not Hit the Ground. Edited by Lisa Mark. Texts by John Armleder, Andrew Berardini, Piero Golia, Pierre Huyghe, Richard Jackson, Emilie Renard, Eric Wesley. Paperback, 5.75 x 8.25 in. 100 pgs. Pub Date 1/31/2011. Out of print. 
Akademie X: Lessons in Art + Life. Abramovic, Marina; Eliasson, Olafur; Graham, Dan; Studio Rags Media Collective. Format: Paperback. Size: 290 x 214 mm (11 3/8 x 8 3/8 in). Pages: 352 pp. Illustrations: 200 illustrations 
Art School: (Propositions for the 21st Century), Publisher : The MIT Press; First THUS Edition (September 11, 2009). Language : English. Paperback : 373 pages.

External links
 Bortolami Gallery - Piero Golia
 
 Gagosian Gallery - Piero Golia
 LA Times - Piero Golia’s outlandish Chalet Hollywood, an art speakeasy
 Piero Golia Kapsul Image Collection
 Piero Golia - Myth Maker (Gagosian Quarterly Magazine)
Piero Golia - Intermission Paintings (Gagosian Quarterly Magazine)
 NY Arts - Piero Golia at Gagosian Beverly Hills
 Afterall - Artists at Work: Piero Golia
 “Conversation with Piero Golia and Edwin Chan,” an interview on the occasion of Chalet Dallas at the Nasher Sculpture Center, Dallas
 Jori Finkel, “In Los Angeles, Art That’s Worth the Detour,” New York Times, May 1, 2009. 
Doug MacCash, “George Washington’s giant schnoz is a Prospect.3 standout,” Nola.com, October 31, 2014.

References

Italian contemporary artists
1974 births
Living people